The Humanitarian Service Medal (HSM) is a military service medal of the United States Armed Forces which was created on January 19, 1977 by President Gerald Ford under .  The medal may be awarded to members of the United States military (including Reserve and National Guard members) who distinguish themselves by meritorious participation in specified military acts or operations of a humanitarian nature.

Creation
Julia V. Taft, the director of the Interagency Task Force (IATF) for Indochinese resettlement proposed the establishment of a Humanitarian Service Medal for U.S. military personnel and submitted the request to President Gerald R. Ford on November 10, 1975. The medal was to be awarded to those personnel that participated in the evacuation of Vietnamese and Cambodian refugees after the Vietnam War. The proposal was met with dissent by Army Lieutenant General Harold G. Moore, who was concerned that the military was over-decorating its personnel with awards of participation rather than those of extraordinary achievement. He proposed a certificate of achievement as a more appropriate recognition. Army Lieutenant General John W. Vessey supported the creation of the medal as a precedent to recognize military participation in major humanitarian actions. Vessey's view prevailed and President Ford established the medal in 1977 as one of the last acts of his presidency.

Criteria
This medal is presented as an individual service medal.  The activities in which the Humanitarian Service Medal may be authorized are designated by the United States Department of Defense.  Such activities include natural disaster relief, evacuation of non-combatants from a hostile area, or humanitarian support to refugees.  This medal may not be awarded for services rendered in domestic disturbances involving law enforcement, riots, or protection of property.  This medal may also not be presented if either the Armed Forces Service Medal or Armed Forces Expeditionary Medal was presented for the same period of service.

The Humanitarian Service Medal is retroactive to April 2, 1975. 

The Department of the Army awards the Civilian Award for Humanitarian Service for similar service by Army civilian employees, as well as private U.S. and foreign citizens.

Appearance
Centered on the obverse of the medal within a circle, is a right hand pointing diagonally upward with open palm, (to symbolize a giving or helping hand). At the top of the reverse of the medal is the inscription, For Humanitarian Service in three lines. Below this is an oak branch, with three leaves and three acorns, and below this, around the outside edge of the medal, is the inscription, United States Armed Forces.

 Additional awards and devices
Subsequent awards of the Humanitarian Service Medal are denoted by wearing a bronze service star on the HSM suspension and service ribbon. A silver service star is worn in lieu of five bronze service stars.

Approved operations
Below is a list of approved operations in accordance with the Department of Defense.

References

1977 establishments in the United States
Awards established in 1977
Humanitarian and service awards
United States service medals